Tadayuki 'Taddy' Okada (born February 13, 1967) is a Japanese former professional Grand Prix motorcycle road racer. He was runner-up in the 1994 250cc and in the 1997 500cc World Championship.

Early career
Okada won the 250cc All Japan Road Race Championship in three successive years from 1989 to 1991 for Honda. Honda then entered him into the 250cc World Championship in 1993. He was runner-up in the series in 1994, and fourth in 1995.

500cc and beyond
Okada stepped up to 500cc in 1996, helping develop the V-twin Honda NSR500V and finished the season in 7th overall. In 1997, he claimed his first 500cc win in Indonesia and finished second to Mick Doohan. He missed several races in 1998 due to a wrist injury but bounced back in 1999 to finish third in the championship, with wins at Assen, Brno and Phillip Island. Okada chose to retire at the end of the year. He made a one-off wildcard appearance at the 2008 Italian Grand Prix at Mugello in June, finishing 14th, in the first race for the pneumatic valved Honda RC212V.

Grand Prix career statistics
Points system from 1988 to 1992:

Points system from 1993 onwards:

(key) (Races in bold indicate pole position)

References

External links

Tadayuki Okada profile at Crash.net

1967 births
Living people
500cc World Championship riders
Superbike World Championship riders
Japanese motorcycle racers
250cc World Championship riders
Repsol Honda MotoGP riders
MotoGP World Championship riders